Maoripamborus fairburni is a species of beetle in the family Carabidae, the only described species in the genus (though there are some reports of an additional undescribed species). The genus is endemic to the northern North Island of New Zealand, and is most closely related to the Australian genus Pamborus.

References

Further reading
 Harris, A.C. 1992: A note on Maoripamborus fairburni (Coleoptera: Carabidae: Cychrini). Weta, 15: 42–44. full article (PDF)
 Worthy, T.H. 1983: Subfossil insects - a key to past diversity. Weta, 6(2): 42–43. full article (PDF)
 Link to image

Carabinae
Monotypic Carabidae genera
Endemic fauna of New Zealand
Beetles of New Zealand
Endemic insects of New Zealand
Monotypic beetle genera